Dean Hall may refer to:

 Dean Hall (game designer) (born 1981), New Zealand video game designer
 Dean Hall (racing driver) (born 1957), American former racing driver
 Dean Hall (rugby union) (born 1977), former South African rugby player